Lwan Nay Mal Ma Ma is a 1986 Burmese musical-drama film, directed by U Tin Yu starring Kyaw Hein, Cho Pyone and Swe Zin Htaik. It was based on the popular novel "A Lal Ka Lu Sakar Wae Ei", written by Nwam Jar Thaing.

Cast
Kyaw Hein as Yan Naing
Cho Pyone as Aye Ma Ma
Swe Zin Htaik as Nwe Mon
Zaw Htoo as Maw Si
May Thit as Mother of Yan Naing
Myint Naing as Saw Oo
Eant Kyaw

References

1986 films
1980s Burmese-language films
Burmese drama films
Films shot in Myanmar
1986 drama films